Choi Ji-ho (born November 25, 1980) is a South Korean actor and model. He began his entertainment career in 2003 as part of Model Line's stable, walking the runways for Gucci, Armani, Nike, EXR, Lacoste, Dolce & Gabbana, as well as Korean designers Lee Ju-young, Choi Chang-ho and Noh Seung-eun. Choi then made his acting debut in 2007, and has since starred in stage musicals such as Finding Kim Jong-wook and Thrill Me, and the films Antique (2008) and Troubleshooter (2010).

Filmography

Film

Television series

Variety show

Music video

Theater

Awards and nominations

References

External links 
 Choi Ji-ho Fansite Single Man 
 Choi Ji-ho Fan Cafe at Daum 
 
 
 

1980 births
Living people
21st-century South Korean male actors
South Korean male television actors
South Korean male film actors
South Korean male models
Male actors from Seoul
South Korean male taekwondo practitioners